HMS Appledore was a Hunt-class minesweeper of the Aberdare sub-class built for the Royal Navy during World War I. She was not finished in time to participate in the First World War and was sold into civilian service in 1920.

Design and description
The Aberdare sub-class were enlarged versions of the original Hunt-class ships with a more powerful armament. The ships displaced  at normal load. The ships' complement consisted of 74 officers and ratings.

The ships had two vertical triple-expansion steam engines, each driving one shaft, using steam provided by two Yarrow boilers.

The Aberdare sub-class was armed with a quick-firing (QF)  gun forward of the bridge and a QF twelve-pounder (76.2 mm) anti-aircraft gun aft. Some ships were fitted with six- or three-pounder guns in lieu of the twelve-pounder.

Construction and career
HMS Appledore was built by the Ailsa Shipbuilding Company at their shipyard in Troon, Ayrshire. She was  launched on 15 August 1919 and sold a year later and was renamed Kamlawti.

Notes

References
 
 
 

 

Hunt-class minesweepers (1916)
1919 ships